The 1904 United States presidential election in Idaho took place on November 8, 1904. All contemporary 45 states were part of the 1904 United States presidential election. State voters chose three electors to the Electoral College, which selected the president and vice president.

Although the Republican Party had not carried Idaho in any of the state’s three previous presidential elections, at state level the Gem State had begun in 1902 to be very much a one-party Republican state, which it has largely remained since apart from the New Deal era of the 1930s and 1940s. Moreover, Democratic nominee Alton Brooks Parker’s defense of the Gold Standard, which harked back to Grover Cleveland, aroused no enthusiasm in Idaho. Nor did his opposition to Roosevelt’s policy of imperialism in the Pacific, whilst Roosevelt’s strong efforts to regulate big businesses were extremely popular in the remote Northwest. Parker was also affected by the perception that the Bryan Democrats had failed severely as a party of reform.

As a result, Roosevelt was able to achieve the first-ever Republican victory in Idaho by an overwhelming margin – 40.38 percentage points – in the process emulating William Jennings Bryan’s 1896 sweep of all Idaho’s counties.

Results

Results by county

See also
 United States presidential elections in Idaho

Notes

References

Idaho
1904
1904 Idaho elections